Juan Bautista Miles Passo (24 June 1895 – 18 December 1981) was an Argentine polo player who competed in the 1924 Summer Olympics. He was born and died  in Buenos Aires. His nickname was "El Sordo" (The deaf) due to his hearing problems he got while he was working for a Railway Company in Buenos Aires. In 1924 Miles was part of the Argentine polo team, which won the gold medal.

References

External links
profile

Argentine people of British descent
1895 births
1981 deaths
Argentine polo players
Olympic gold medalists for Argentina
Olympic polo players of Argentina
Polo players at the 1924 Summer Olympics
Medalists at the 1924 Summer Olympics
Olympic medalists in polo
Sportspeople from Buenos Aires